The 2003 Bayelsa State House of Assembly election was held on May 3, 2003, to elect members of the Bayelsa State House of Assembly in Nigeria. All the 24 seats were up for election in the Bayelsa State House of Assembly.

Seibarugu Werinipre from PDP representing Yenagoa II constituency was elected Speaker, while Nestor Binabo from PDP representing Sagbama II constituency was elected Deputy Speaker.

Results 
The result of the election is listed below.

 Steve Ereboh from PDP won Southern Ijaw I constituency
 Hawkins Kalabo from PDP won Southern Ijaw II constituency
 Adolphus Ofongo from PDP won Southern Ijaw III constituency
 Nimibofa Ayawei from PDP won Southern Ijaw IV constituency
 Arthur Apeti from PDP won Brass I constituency
 Michael Kumosuonyo from PDP won Brass II constituency
 Nelson Belief from PDP won Brass III constituency
 Imomotimi Fanama from PDP won Sagbama I constituency
 Bright K. A. Agagowei from PDP won Sagbama II constituency
 Williams D. Ofoni from PDP won Sagbama III constituency
 Amakiri Etebu from PDP won Kolokuma/Opokuma I constituency
 Waripamo Dudafa from PDP won Kolokuma/Opokuma II constituency
 Peremobowei Ebebi from PDP won Ekeremor I constituency
 Boyelayefa Debekeme from PDP won Ekeremor II constituency
 Dein Benadoumene from PDP won Ekeremor III constituency
 Karibo Nadu from PDP won Ogbia I constituency
 Robert Enogha from PDP won Ogbia II constituency
 Elliot Osomu from PDP won Ogbia III constituency
 Johnson S. Alalibo from PDP won Yenagoa I constituency
 Seibarugu Werinipre from PDP won Yenagoa II constituency
 Franklin Otele from PDP won Yenagoa III constituency
 Bright N. Erewari from PDP won Nembe I constituency
 Foingha Jephthah from PDP won Nembe II constituency
 Otobo Noah Opusiri from PDP won Nembe III constituency

References 

House of Assembly
Bayelsa State House of Assembly elections
Bayelsa